The Catholic Lexicon is a large-scale Hungarian lexicon of the early 20th century.

History 
The work, made by several authors, was published in 4 volumes between 1931 and 1933 in Budapest by Magyar Kultúra. It has a total size of about 2100 pages. The volumes contain biographies of a large number of Christian persons, definition of religion, or a concept related to religion. The illustration is aided by black and white and color illustrations. There is no facsimile edition of the work, but it is available in electronic form at the website of Arcanum Kft.

Order of volumes

Sources 
 Volumes of the lexicon
 Digitized edition

Hungarian encyclopedias
Christian encyclopedias
20th-century encyclopedias